VfL Frohnlach is a German association football club from the municipality of Frohnlach in Ebersdorf bei Coburg, Bavaria.



History
The club was established as Sports Club Arminia Frohnlach in 1919 and, after a 1925 merger with Turnverein Frohnlach, became Verein für Leibesübungen 1919 e. V. Frohnlach. In addition to fielding a football side the sports club had departments for cycling, fistball, and gymnastics. Like other clubs that were part of the Arbeiter-Turn- und -Sportbundes (Worker's Gymnastics and Sports Union) VfL was banned in 1933 by the Nazi regime as politically undesirable. After World War II it was re-established as TV Frohnlach and before the end of 1945 was playing as Allgemeine Sportvereinigung Frohnlach. By 1948 the association was again known as VfL.

The footballers took part in lower level local play in the Coburg district league, until the mid-70s when the club made a rapid ascent with the support of local furniture maker Willi Schillig, who took on the presidency and a major sponsorship role. Three consecutive promotions from 1978 to 1980 saw the club through to the fourth division Bayernliga. They also made their first appearance in DFB-Pokal (German Cup) play in 1980 where they were put out in the second round by Stuttgarter Kickers (0:9). Frohnlach enjoyed a decade long run in the Bayernliga until slipping to become an elevator side, moving frequently up and down between fourth- and fifth-tier play. The team competed as an Bayernliga side in 1992–93, 1994–99, and 2004–07. Their most current result, a 16th-place finish, saw the club sent down to the Landesliga Bayern-Nord (V), where they finished on top and returned to the Bayernliga for the 2008–09 season.

After another relegation in 2010 the club promptly bounced back and won the Landesliga title for a fifth time in 2011. At the end of the 2011–12 season the club managed to finish in the top nine of the Bayernliga and thereby directly qualified for the new tier four Regionalliga Bayern. In the 2012–13 season the club struggled in the bottom region of the table all season and was eventually relegated back to the Bayernliga. Frohnlach had to enter the relegation round in the 2015–16 Bayernliga season and, after two loses against Würzburger Kickers II, was initially relegated but was awarded another opportunity by having to face SV Erlbach for one more Bayernliga spot where the club successfully defended its league place.

Honours

League
 Landesliga Bayern-Nord (V)
 Champions: (5) 1980, 1992, 2004, 2008, 2011
 Runners-up: (2) 1991, 2002

Cup
 Oberfranken Cup
 Winner: (3) 2003, 2005, 2009

Recent managers
Recent managers of the club:

Recent seasons
The recent season-by-season performance of the club:

With the introduction of the Bezirksoberligas in 1988 as the new fifth tier, below the Landesligas, all leagues below dropped one tier. With the introduction of the Regionalligas in 1994 and the 3. Liga in 2008 as the new third tier, below the 2. Bundesliga, all leagues below dropped one tier. With the establishment of the Regionalliga Bayern as the new fourth tier in Bavaria in 2012 the Bayernliga was split into a northern and a southern division, the number of Landesligas expanded from three to five and the Bezirksoberligas abolished. All leagues from the Bezirksligas onwards were elevated one tier.

Stadium
Between 1958 and 1980 the club played its home matches at Am Wirtsteich until the opening of the Waldstadion (capacity 5,000). The stadium has served as a venue for matches of the German junior national U20 and U21 teams. In 2006 the facility was renamed for club president Willi Schillig.

DFB Cup appearances
The club has qualified for the first round of the German Cup just once:

References

Sources
Grüne, Hardy (2001). Vereinslexikon. Kassel: AGON Sportverlag

External links
 Official team site  
 VfL Frohnlach at Weltfussball.de  
 Das deutsche Fußball-Archiv  historical German domestic league tables

Association football clubs established in 1919
Football clubs in Germany
Football clubs in Bavaria
Football in Upper Franconia
1919 establishments in Germany
Sports clubs banned by the Nazis
Coburg (district)